The Household Cavalry (HCav) is made up of the two most senior regiments of the British Army, the Life Guards and the Blues and Royals (Royal Horse Guards and 1st Dragoons). These regiments are divided between the Household Cavalry Regiment stationed at Kiwi Barracks in Wiltshire and the ceremonial mounted unit, the Household Cavalry Mounted Regiment, garrisoned at Hyde Park Barracks (Knightsbridge Barracks) in London. The Household Cavalry is part of the Household Division and is the King's official bodyguard.  Although the Household Cavalry Regiment is armoured, it is not part of the Royal Armoured Corps.

Life Guards and Blues and Royals 

The British Household Cavalry is classed as a corps in its own right, and consists of two regiments: the Life Guards and the Blues and Royals (Royal Horse Guards and 1st Dragoons). They are the senior regular regiments in the British Army, with traditions dating from 1660, and act as the King's personal bodyguard. They are guards regiments and, with the five foot guard regiments, constitute the seven guards regiments of the Household Division.

Organisation 

Below is the structure of the regiment:

 Household Cavalry Regiment, at Powle Lines, Bulford Camp (Armoured Reconnaissance)
 Regimental Headquarters
 Headquarters Squadron
 A Squadron
 C Squadron
 D Squadron
 Household Cavalry Mounted Regiment, at Knightsbridge Barracks, London (Ceremonial)
 Regimental Headquarters
 Headquarters Squadron
 Winter Training Troop
 Forge and Veterinary Department
 Household Cavalry Training Wing, at Combermere Barracks, Windsor
 Life Guards Squadron
 Blues and Royals Squadron

The Household Cavalry as a whole is split into two different units that fulfil very distinct roles. These are both joint units, consisting of personnel from both regiments. Like other Cavalry formations, the Household Cavalry is divided into regiments (battalion-sized units) and squadrons (company-sized sub-units). The whole corps is under the command of the Commander Household Cavalry (formerly Lieutenant-Colonel Commanding Household Cavalry), who also holds the Royal Household appointment of Silver Stick in Waiting. He is a Colonel, and is assisted by a retired lieutenant colonel as Regimental Adjutant.

The Household Cavalry Regiment (HCR) has an active operational role as a Formation Reconnaissance Regiment, serving in armoured fighting vehicles, which has seen them at the forefront of the nation's conflicts. The regiment forms one of five formation reconnaissance regiments in the British Army's order of battle. The HCR has four operational squadrons, three of which are traditional medium reconnaissance squadrons equipped with the combat vehicle reconnaissance (tracked) or CVR(T) range of vehicles (Scimitar, Spartan, Sultan, Samson and Samaritan) and the fourth is referred to as Command and Support Squadron and includes specialists, such as Forward Air Controllers. One of HCR's squadrons is assigned to the airborne role with 16 Air Assault Brigade as of 2003. The Regiment was formerly based at Combermere Barracks, Windsor, one mile from Windsor Castle, until its move to Bulford Camp, Wiltshire, in May 2019. The members of the Household Division have sometimes been required to undertake special tasks as the Sovereign's personal troops. The Household Cavalry were called to Windsor Castle on 20 November 1992 to assist with salvage operations following the 1992 Windsor Castle fire.

The Household Cavalry Mounted Regiment (HCMR) is horsed and carries out mounted (and some dismounted) ceremonial duties on State and Royal occasions. These include the provision of a Sovereign's Escort, most commonly seen on The King's Birthday Parade (Trooping the Colour) in June each year. Other occasions include state visits by visiting heads of state, or whenever required by the British monarch, including ceremonies associated with the Death and state funeral of Elizabeth II. The regiment also mounts the guard at Horse Guards. HCMR consists of one squadron from The Life Guards, one from The Blues and Royals and a squadron called Headquarters Squadron, which is responsible for all administrative matters and includes the regimental headquarters (RHQ), the Riding Staff, Farriers, Tailors and Saddlers. The Regiment has been based (in various forms) at Hyde Park Barracks, Knightsbridge, since 1795.

New troopers and officers are generally first assigned to London upon completion of horsemanship training and remain there for up to three years. Like the five Foot Guards regiments they rotate between the operational unit and ceremonial duties.

Ranks

Officers 
Second Lieutenants in The Blues and Royals are known as Cornets.

NCO's and other ranks 
The rank names and insignia of non-commissioned officers in the Household Cavalry are unique in the British Army:

Recruits were required to have a very high moral character. Before the Second World War, recruits were required to be at least 5 feet 10 inches tall, but could not exceed 6 feet 1 inch. They initially enlisted for eight years with the colours and a further four years with the reserve.

Army farriers 

There is a farrier on call twenty-four hours a day, at Hyde Park Barracks.

Farriers traditionally combined veterinary knowledge with blacksmiths' skills. They were responsible for hoof trimming and fitting horseshoes to horses. They also dealt with the "humane dispatch of wounded and sick horses", accomplished with the large spike on the end of their axes. Then they used the sharp blade of the axe to chop off the deceased animal's hoof, which was marked with its regimental number. This assisted in keeping track of animals killed in action.

Although the axes are not used any more, army farriers still carry these axes, with their characteristic blade and spike, at ceremonial events such as Trooping the Colour.

In the Blues and Royals, the farriers dress like their comrades in regimental uniform. The distinctive uniform and equipment of the farriers of the Life Guards—blue tunic, black plume and axe—is a historic reminder of the old British Army of the days of James Wolfe. Every cavalry regiment in the Army, other than the Royal Horse Guards (The Blues), originally wore scarlet for all ranks, except the farriers. Farriers were garbed invariably in sombre blue and bore axes, worn at the side, like the swords of their comrades. When on parade, the troopers drew swords, the Farriers drew axes and carried them at the "Advance".

Following every parade is a duty horse-box, known as the Veterinary Aid Post, with a specialist emergency team in attendance.

Musical Ride 
The Musical Ride of the Mounted Regiments of the Household Cavalry was first performed at the Royal Tournament in 1882. The two trumpeters sitting on grey horses were historically intended to form a contrast with the darker horses, so that they could be seen on battlefields when relaying officers' commands to the troops. The troops weave around the trumpeters and the celebrated drumhorse, Spartacus.

Band 
The Mounted Band of the Household Cavalry was a merger in 2014 of the 35 piece Band of the Blues and Royals and the 35 piece Band of the Life Guards. They are now one band of 64 musicians but wear the uniform of both The Blues and Royals and The Life Guards. They come under RCAM, the Royal Corps of Army Music. They also provide State Trumpeters for events of state.

Order of precedence 
In the British Army Order of Precedence, the Household Cavalry is always listed first and always parades at the extreme right of the line, save in cases that the guns of the Royal Horse Artillery are to be first in line during parades.

Place in British society 
The two regiments of the Household Cavalry are regarded as the most prestigious in the British Army, due to their role as the monarch's official bodyguard. Historically, this meant regularly being in close proximity to the reigning sovereign. As such, the soldiers, and especially officers, of the Household Cavalry were once drawn exclusively from the British aristocracy. While this is no longer the case, the Household Cavalry still draws many of its officers from the upper classes and gentry, and maintains a close personal connection to the Royal Family; both William, Prince of Wales and Prince Harry, Duke of Sussex were commissioned into the Blues and Royals. On occasions, this has led the Household Cavalry to be accused of elitism.

The Household Cavalry Foundation 
The Household Cavalry is supported by the Household Cavalry Foundation, the regimental charity, which raises funds in aid of five core themes: casualties, veterans, serving soldiers, horses and heritage.

The Household Cavalry Regiment Museum 

The Household Cavalry has two museums. The Household Cavalry Museum is located at Horse Guards Parade in central London, where the HCMR mounts the King's Life Guard.  The museum is a very popular tourist attraction with digital audio guides in several languages. The museum includes a window into the working stables of the King's Life Guard, allowing visitors to watch ongoing care of the horses throughout the day.  Separately, the Household Cavalry Regiment has its own museum at Combermere Barracks in Windsor.  A volunteer team organise tours and events and, in particular, administer the regiment's extensive material, documentary and photographic archives.  The museum is open to public groups, by appointment.

Notable members 
 James Blount 1997–2002, stage name James Blunt (Life Guards), singer / songwriter
 Tommy Cooper, (Royal Horse Guards)
 Michael Flynn (Blues and Royals)
 Craig Harrison (Blues and Royals)
 Jack Higgins (Blues and Royals), author
 Victor McLaglen (Life Guards), film actor
 Ray Milland (Royal Horse Guards The Blues), film actor
 Jack Charlton (Royal Horse Guards The Blues), footballer
 Andrew Parker Bowles (Blues and Royals)
 Prince Harry, Duke of Sussex (Blues and Royals)
 The Prince of Wales (Blues and Royals)

Lieutenant Colonels commanding Household Cavalry 

These have included:
 1959–1960: Colonel the Marquess of Douro
 1960–1964: Colonel the Hon. Julian Berry
 1964–1966: Colonel David J. St.M. Tabor
 1966–1969: Colonel Harry S. Hopkinson
 1969–1972: Colonel Ian B. Baillie
 1972–1975: Colonel H. Desmond A. Langley
 1975–1978: Colonel James A. C. G. Eyre
 1978–1981: Colonel Simon C. Cooper
 1981–1982: Colonel Andrew J. Hartigan
 1982–1986: Colonel James G. Hamilton-Russell
 1986–1987: Colonel James B. Emson
 1987–1990: Colonel Andrew H. Parker Bowles
 1990–1993: Colonel Jeremy D. Smith-Bingham
 1993–1997: Colonel Peter B. Rogers
 1997–1999: Colonel P. Simon W.F. Falkner
 1999–2000: Colonel W. Toby Browne
 2000–2005: Colonel Hamon P.D. Massey
 2005–2009: Colonel Patrick J. Tabor
 2009–2010: Colonel W. Toby Browne
 2010–2014: Colonel Stuart H. Cowen
 2014–2019: Major-General Sir Edward Smyth-Osbourne
 2019–2022: Colonel Crispin Lockhart, MBE
 2022–present: Colonel M. S. P. Berry

Affiliated Yeomanry 
 A (Ayrshire (Earl of Carrick's Own) Yeomanry) Squadron, The Queen's Own Yeomanry

See also 

 
 Barnsby Saddles (1793)
 Household Cavalry Museum
 Household Cavalry Coach Troop
 Household Division
 President's Bodyguard
 King's Guard
 Trooping the Colour

References

Further reading 
 Watson, J.N.P. Through Fifteen Reigns: A Complete History of the Household Cavalry. Staplehurst: Spellmount Limited, 1997.

External links 

 Household Cavalry on British Army website
 Household Cavalry on Household Division website
 Household Cavalry Foundation website
 Household Cavalry Museum website
 
 

 
Armoured units and formations of the British Army